St Alban's Church is a Church of England parish church in Frant, East Sussex, England. It was built in 1819–22 in a fifteenth-century gothic revival style and is a grade II listed building.

References 

Church of England church buildings in East Sussex
Grade II listed churches in East Sussex
Alban